Polish–Ottoman Wars can refer to one of the several conflicts between the Polish–Lithuanian Commonwealth and the Ottoman Empire:

 Crusade of Varna (1443-1444)
 Polish–Ottoman War (1485–1503)
 Jan Olbracht's Moldavian expedition of 1497 and Ottoman's retribution raid a year later
 Moldavian Magnate Wars, a period of near constant warfare at the end of the 16th century and the beginning of the 17th century, ending with:
 Polish–Ottoman War (1620–21)
 Polish–Ottoman War (1633–34)
 Polish–Cossack–Tatar War (1666–71)
 Polish–Ottoman War (1672–76)
 as part of the Great Turkish War:
 Polish–Ottoman War (1683–99)

See also